Tia and Tamara may refer to:

 Sister, Sister (TV series), a television sitcom starring Tia and Tamera Mowry.
 Actresses Tia Mowry and Tamera Mowry.
 The reality series Tia & Tamera